Frank Smith (born c. 1931) was a Canadian football player who played for the Edmonton Eskimos. He won the Grey Cup with them in 1954, 1955 and 1956. He attended Olympic College where he played college football.

Smith also coached football at Eastern Washington University, Wenatchee Junior College, and Montana State University. In 1973, he took a position at the University of British Columbia, coaching until 1994, during which time he won five conference titles and Canadian Interuniversity Sport championships in 1982 and 1986. His final record with UBC was 126–90–4. He was hired to the coaching staff of the BC Lions in 1997, 1998 and 2000 and also served on the coaching staff of the Saskatchewan Roughriders. He was inducted in the UBC Sports Hall of Fame as a builder in 2012.

References

1931 births
Living people
Edmonton Elks players
Calgary Stampeders players
Winnipeg Blue Bombers players
BC Lions players
Canadian football people from Vancouver
Eastern Washington Eagles football coaches
Junior college football coaches in the United States
Montana State Bobcats football coaches
UBC Thunderbirds football coaches
BC Lions coaches
Saskatchewan Roughriders coaches
Players of Canadian football from British Columbia